Harbor City Roller Derby (HCRD) is a women's flat track roller derby league based in Duluth, Minnesota. Founded in 2007, the league consists of two teams, which compete against teams from other leagues. Harbor City is a member of the Women's Flat Track Derby Association (WFTDA).

History
Harbor City was founded as Harbor City Roller Dames in January 2007 by Melissa LaTour, known as "Ginger Suicide".  For a while, it was run by Michael and Mary Utecht, but in October 2009, it became skater-owned.

Harbor City played its first full season in 2010, and sold out a 1,200-seat venue for one bout.

The league was accepted as a member of the Women's Flat Track Derby Association Apprentice Program in October 2011, and became a full member of the WFTDA in June 2013, and debuted in the WFTDA Rankings on March 31, 2014 at 129 overall. In August 2014, Harbor City hosted one of the WFTDA Division 2 playoff tournaments.

WFTDA rankings

References

Sports in Duluth, Minnesota
Roller derby leagues established in 2007
Roller derby leagues in Minnesota
Women's Flat Track Derby Association Division 3
2007 establishments in Minnesota